Reginald Hollis was the 9th Anglican bishop of Montreal from 1975 to 1990.

Born on 18 July 1932 in Bedworth, UK, he died in Victoria, British Columbia, on November 9, 2010. He served in the Royal Air Force during the Second World War before he enrolled in theology at Selwyn College, Cambridge, and McGill University before studying for ordination and embarking  on an academic ecclesiastical career with chaplaincies at the Montreal Diocese Theological College (where he also lectured) and McGill. Pastoral posts in Quebec led to an administrative role as director of parish and diocesan services back in Montreal and in the mid-1970s elevation to that  see's bishopric. In 1989, he was appointed as Metropolitan of the Province of Canada.

On his retirement to Florida in 1990, he became the episcopal director of the Anglican Fellowship of Prayer and an honorary assistant bishop within the Episcopal Diocese of Central Florida.

See also
List of Anglican Bishops of Montreal

References

1932 births
2010 deaths
20th-century Anglican Church of Canada bishops
Alumni of Selwyn College, Cambridge
McGill University alumni
Anglican bishops of Montreal
Metropolitans of Canada
People from Bedworth